Egusa (江草 or 江種) is a Japanese surname. Notable people with the surname include:

, Japanese baseball player
, Japanese judoka

Japanese-language surnames